The 1942 United States Senate election in Kentucky took place on November 3, 1942. Incumbent Democratic Senator Happy Chandler was re-elected to a full term in office over Republican Richard J. Colbert.

General election

Candidates
Happy Chandler, incumbent Senator since 1939 and former Governor (Democratic)
 Richard J. Colbert, Lexington attorney (Republican)

Results

See also
1942 United States Senate elections

Notes

References 

1942
Kentucky
United States Senate